The 2016–17 Michigan Wolverines women's basketball team represented University of Michigan during the 2016–17 NCAA Division I women's basketball season. The Wolverines, led by fifth year head coach Kim Barnes Arico, play their home games at the Crisler Center and are members of the Big Ten Conference.

Roster

Schedule

|-
!colspan=9 style="background:#242961; color:#F7BE05;"| Exhibition

|-
!colspan=9 style="background:#242961; color:#F7BE05;"| Non-conference regular season

|-
!colspan=9 style="background:#242961; color:#F7BE05;"| Big Ten regular season

|-
!colspan=9 style="text-align: center; background:#242961"|Big Ten Women's tournament

|-
!colspan=9 style="text-align: center; background:#242961"|Women's National Invitation Tournament

Rankings

See also
 2016–17 Michigan Wolverines men's basketball team

References

Michigan
Michigan
Michigan
2017 Women's National Invitation Tournament participants
Michigan Wolverines women's basketball seasons
Women's National Invitation Tournament championship seasons